The Lazio regional election of 1990 took place on 6 and 7 May 1990.

Events
Christian Democracy was by far the largest party, largely ahead of the Italian Communist Party, which placed second. After the election Christian Democrat Rodolfo Gigli formed a government which included the Italian Socialist Party and some minor parties (Pentapartito).

After 1992, following the Tangentopoli scandals, Gigli was succeeded by a succession of governments led by Giorgio Pasetto (Christian Democrat, 1992–1994), Carlo Proietti (Democratic Party of the Left, 1994–1995) and Arturo Osio (Green, 1995).

Results

Source: Ministry of the Interior

Elections in Lazio
1990 elections in Italy